Boca is a 2010 Brazilian crime-drama film directed by Flavio Frederico. The film was screened at the 2010 Festival do Rio.

Inspired by the autobiography of Hiroto de Moraes Joanide (played by Daniel de Oliveira), the film is set in the Boca do Lixo, a prostitution zone in São Paulo during the 1950s and 1960s.

Cast
Daniel de Oliveira as Hiroito
Hermila Guedes as Alaíde
Jefferson Brasil as Nelsinho
Milhem Cortaz as Osmar
Paulo César Peréio as Dr. Honório
Maxwell Nascimento as Robertinho
Camila Lecciolli as Clarinha
Juliana Galdino as Telma
Leandra Leal as Silvia
Claudio Jaborandy as Carlito

References

External links
 

2010 films
Brazilian crime drama films
Films set in São Paulo
2010 crime drama films
2010s Portuguese-language films